Taningia persica is a species of squid in the family Octopoteuthidae. Its validity has been questioned.  The description of Taningia persica is based on a paralarva of Taningia (4.7 mm ML) from the Gulf of Aden, presumably Taningia danae.

External links

Squid
Gulf of Aden
Marine molluscs of Africa
Marine molluscs of Asia
Molluscs described in 1923
Taxa named by Adolf Naef